The 1957–58 Segunda División season was the 27th since its establishment and was played between 15 September 1957 and 1 June 1958.

Overview before the season
36 teams joined the league, including two relegated from the 1956–57 La Liga and 4 promoted from the 1956–57 Tercera División.

Relegated from La Liga
Deportivo La Coruña
Condal

Promoted from Tercera División'''
Basconia
Alcoyano
Recreativo
Plus Ultra

Group North

Teams

League table

Results

Top goalscorers

Top goalkeepers

Group South

Teams

League table

Results

Top goalscorers

Top goalkeepers

Relegation playoffs

First leg

Second leg

External links
BDFútbol

Segunda División seasons
2
Spain